Avajiq-e Jonubi Rural District is in Dashtaki District of Chaldoran County, West Azerbaijan province, Iran. At the National Census of 2006, its population was 4,543 in 883 households. There were 3,364 inhabitants in 852 households at the following census of 2011. At the most recent census of 2016, the population of the rural district was 2,932 in 817 households. The largest of its 33 villages was Shadluy-e Sofla, with 310 people.

References 

Chaldoran County

Rural Districts of West Azerbaijan Province

Populated places in West Azerbaijan Province

Populated places in Chaldoran County